This timeline of the American Old West is a chronologically ordered list of events significant to the development of the American West as a region of the continental United States. The term "American Old West" refers to a vast geographical area and lengthy-time period of imprecise boundaries, and historians' definitions vary. The events in this timeline occurred primarily in the portion of the modern continental United States west of the Mississippi River, and mostly in the period between the Louisiana Purchase in 1803 and the admission of the last western territories as states in 1912 where most of the frontier was already settled and became urbanized; a few typical frontier episodes happened after that, such as the admission of Alaska into the Union in 1959. A brief section summarizing early exploration and settlement prior to 1803 is included to provide a foundation for later developments. Rarely, events significant to the history of the West but which occurred within the modern boundaries of Canada and Mexico are included as well.

Western North America was inhabited for millennia by various groups of Native Americans and later served as a frontier to the Spanish Empire, which began colonizing the region starting in the 16th century. British, French, and Russian claims followed in the 18th and 19th centuries, though these did not result in settlement and the region remained in Spanish hands. After the American Revolution, the newly independent United States began securing its own frontier from the Appalachian Mountains westward for settlement and economic investment by American pioneers. The long history of American expansion into these lands has played a central role in shaping American culture, iconography, and the modern national identity, and remains a popular topic for study by scholars and historians.

Events listed below are notable developments for the region as a whole, not just for a particular state or smaller subdivision of the region; as historians Hine and Faragher put it, they "tell the story of the creation and defense of communities, the use of the lands, the development of markets, and the formation of states.... It is a tale of conquest, but also one of survival, persistence, and the merging of peoples and cultures."

Early exploration and settlement

For almost three centuries after Columbus' voyages to the New World, much of western North America remained unsettled by white colonists, despite various territorial claims made by European colonial powers. European interest in the vast territory was initially motivated by the search for precious metals, especially gold, and the fur trade, with miners, trappers, and hunters among the first people of European descent to permanently settle in the West. The early years were also a period of scientific exploration and survey, such that by 1830 the rough outline of the western half of the continent had been mapped to the Pacific Ocean.

1800s

1810s

1820s

1830s

1840s

1850s

1860s

1870s

1880s

1890s

1900s

1910s

1950s

See also

Historic regions of the United States
Territorial evolution of the United States
List of Old West gunfights
Western United States
Mountain States
Northwestern United States
Southwestern United States
Pacific States
Great Plains
Rocky Mountains
Great Basin
Sierra Nevada
Cascade Range

References

External links

New Perspectives On The West. The West Film Project, WETA-TV, 2001.

Old West

American Old West